Berrima is a historic village in the Southern Highlands of New South Wales, Australia, in Wingecarribee Shire. The village, once a major town, is located on the Old Hume Highway between Sydney and Canberra. It was previously known officially as the Town of Berrima. It is close to the three major towns of the Southern Highlands: Mittagong, Bowral and Moss Vale.

Etymology 
The name Berrima is believed to derive from an Aboriginal word meaning either "southward" or "black swan".

History 

The area around Berrima was once occupied by the Dharawal Aborigines.

The region and Wingecarribee River was first visited by Europeans during the late 1790s, including a 1798 expedition led by an ex-convict, John Wilson. However, John and Hamilton Hume rediscovered the area in 1814. The area was explored by Charles Throsby in 1818. Runs were taken up soon after, including by one by Charles Throsby. Harper's Mansion, which is on a hill overlooking the town, was built from 1829 to 1830. Bong Bong had been planned as a major town for the county but, as it was flood prone, the New South Wales surveyor-general Thomas Mitchell chose Berrima townsite on the road running south from Sydney to Goulburn with the intention that the town be the chief centre for southern New South Wales. The survey was conducted in 1830 and the town plan was approved in 1831. As well as its being an administrative centre, there were ambitions that the town might become a commercial and manufacturing centre, "where the wool of Argyle and Camden might be made into cloth and the hide into leather".

The courthouse (see below) was built between 1833 and 1838. The gaol (see below) was built from 1835 by convict labour and opened in 1839.  The Surveyor General Inn was built in 1834. It has been continuously licensed since 1839 and its claim to being the earliest hotel rests on its continual licence and being in the original building. Berrima prospered as being at a point on the Old Hume Highway, and there were fourteen hotels in or near the town in the 1840s. However, because the construction of the railway bypassed the town, the population decreased – no new houses were built for a hundred years. In 1896, Premier of New South Wales Henry Parkes, planted an oak tree near the post office.

There are many historic buildings in the town and the village as a whole is listed on the Register of the National Estate.  Other notable buildings include the Holy Trinity Anglican Church designed by Edmund Blacket and built in 1849; and the St Francis Xavier Catholic Church built 1849–51 designed by Augustus Pugin, a notable British architect of Gothic-revival buildings. The Berrima Village Trust was established in 1963 to preserve historic buildings.

Berrima was bypassed by a new section of the Hume Highway in March 1989.

Heritage listings 
Berrima has a number of heritage-listed sites, including:
 Argyle Street: Berrima Correctional Centre
 Argyle Street: Berrima Internment Camp Huts Area
 Argyle Street: Berrima Post Office
 Argyle Street: Holy Trinity Anglican Church
 Hume Highway: St Francis Xavier's Roman Catholic Church
 Jellore Street: Berrima Inn
 Jellore Street: Victoria Inn
 12 Jellore Street: CBC Bank Building
 16 Jellore Street: Jellore Cottage
 19 Jellore Street: Berrima House
 24 Jellore Street: Mail Coach Inn
 5–7 Market Place: Magistrate's House
 Market Street: White Horse Inn
 5 Market Street: Nurses Cottage
 Stockade Street: Makin Cottage
 Wilkinson Street: Harper's Mansion

Berrima Court House 
Berrima Court House was built between 1836 and 1838. It was designed by the colonial architect Mortimer Lewis in a Roman style.  Four Doric columns support a classical pediment. The building is now stylistically classified as Georgian.  It is built of sandstone.  A number of problems arose during construction, the first architect having resigned and a succession of three builders being contracted.

The first quarter-sessions were held at the court house in 1841, and the first trial by jury in the colony of New South Wales was held here. The assize courts were continued for only seven years. In 1850 the district court moved to Goulburn, south of Berrima. Minor courts continued at Berrima until 1873.  Notable trials were of John Lynch, who was hanged for the murder of at least nine people, and of Lucretia Dunkley and her lover Martin Beech who were both hanged in 1843 for the murder of Dunkley's husband. Their trial is simulated in the present-day museum courtroom with realistic manikins and an audio commentary. Dunkley was the only woman to be hanged at Berrima gaol.

Old Berrima Gaol 

Berrima Gaol was built over five years with much work done by convicts in irons.  Conditions at the gaol were harsh, prisoners spent most of their days in cells and the only light was through a small grate set in the door.  In 1866 the gaol was renovated to the standards described by the prison reform movement for a "model prison".  However, Berrima gaol had solitary confinement cells which measured 8 feet by 5 feet, some smaller, where it was intended that all prisoners spent one year.  In 1877 a royal commission was held to investigate allegations of cruelty by the prison authorities but the complaints were not upheld.

During World War I the army used Berrima Gaol as a German-prisoner internment camp.  Most of the 329 internees were enemy aliens from shipping companies.  There were German officers from Rabaul, German New Guinea (what is now Papua New Guinea) and also officers from the light cruiser SMS Emden.

The correctional centre was used most recently as an all-female low-to-medium security prison. In the 2011 NSW State Budget, the Government announced that the centre would be closed, which took effect on 4 November 2011. The Centre is scheduled to re-open in September 2016.

Population
At the 2021 census, 813 people were living in Berrima.

The most common responses for religion were No Religion 29.8%, Anglican 25.9% and Catholic 17.1%.

Notable residents
 Estelle Asmodelle (born 1964), model, music composer and scientist, grew up in Berrima and left at age 16
 Louisa Atkinson (1834–1872), naturalist and writer
 Jimmy Barnes (born 1956), lead singer of Cold Chisel
 Geoff Harvey (1935–2019), former musical director for the Nine Network
 Leo Sayer (born 1948), singer
 Keith Steele (1951–2009), cricketer and lawyer

References

Bibliography 

 
Towns of the Southern Highlands (New South Wales)
Hume Highway
Wingecarribee Shire